The 2020 U.S. F2000 National Championship was the eleventh season of the U.S. F2000 National Championship since its revival in 2010. The championship serves as the first rung of the IndyCar Series's Road to Indy ladder system. An 18 race schedule was announced on 12 September 2019 featuring six permanent road courses, two street circuits, and a single oval in the Dave Steele Classic.  The Dave Steele Classic race is a standalone race, while the Indianapolis road course race is now a stand-alone round due to the NASCAR Cup Series Big Machine Vodka 400 and GMR Grand Prix is a doubleheader weekend so it is full.

Danish driver Christian Rasmussen, driving for Jay Howard Driver Development, dominated the year, winning over half of all races and clinching the championship title at New Jersey Motorsports Park, two races before the end of the season

Drivers and teams

Schedule

Race results

Championship standings

Drivers' Championship
Scoring system

 The driver who qualifies on pole is awarded one additional point.
 One point is awarded to the driver who leads the most laps in a race.
 One point is awarded to the driver who sets the fastest lap during the race.

See also
2020 IndyCar Series
2020 Indy Lights (canceled)
2020 Indy Pro 2000 Championship

References

External links
 USF2000 official website

2020
U.S. F2000 National Championship